Bessa is a genus of flies in the family Tachinidae.

Species
B. harveyi (Townsend, 1892)
B. selecta (Meigen, 1824)
B. remota (Aldrich, 1925)
B. parallela (Meigen, 1824)

References

Tachinidae genera
Exoristinae
Taxa named by Jean-Baptiste Robineau-Desvoidy